Nationality words link to articles with information on the nation's poetry or literature (for instance, Irish or France).

Events
 The Catholic Church creates the first Index Librorum Prohibitorum, ("Index of Prohibited Books"). Included on the list is Pier Angelo Manzolli's Zodiacus Vitae a poem first published probably in the early 1530s.

Works published
 Joachim du Bellay, Discours au Roi et Le Poète courtisan satire, France
 Antonio Minturno, De poeta ("On Poetry"), Italian criticism (generally thought to be a source of Sir Philip Sidney's Defense of Poesie 1595)
 Jorge de Montemayor, La Diana, pastoral romance, Portuguese
 Marguerite de Navarre, Heptaméron, poems and stories in the manner of Boccaccio's Decameron; posthumously published, France
 Olivier de Magny, Les Odes d'Olivier de Magny, de Cahors en Quercy, A. Wechel

Births
Death years link to the corresponding "[year] in poetry" article:
 December – Lupercio Leonardo de Argensola (died 1613), Spanish poet, playwright and chronicler, brother of poet Bartolome Leonardo de Argensola
 George Chapman (died 1634), English dramatist, translator, and poet

Deaths
Birth years link to the corresponding "[year] in poetry" article:
 Nicolas Denisot (born 1515), French Renaissance poet and painter 
 Yang Shen (born 1488), Chinese poet
 Wen Zhengming (born 1470), Chinese poet, painter and calligrapher

See also

 Poetry
 16th century in poetry
 16th century in literature
 Dutch Renaissance and Golden Age literature
 Elizabethan literature
 French Renaissance literature
 Renaissance literature
 Spanish Renaissance literature

Notes

16th-century poetry
Poetry